The Transcaspian Oblast, or just simply Transcaspia, was the section of Russian Empire and early Soviet Russia to the east of the Caspian Sea during the second half of the 19th century until 1924.

It was bounded to the south by Iran's Khorasan Province and Afghanistan, to the north by the former Russian province of Uralsk, and to the northeast by the former Russian protectorates of Khiva and Bukhara. Area, 212,545 sq. miles. Part of Russian Turkestan, Transcaspian Oblast corresponds roughly to the territory of present-day Turkmenistan and southwestern of Kazakhstan.

The name of the oblast (literally, "Beyond Caspian") is explained by the fact that until the construction of the Trans-Aral Railway in the early 20th century the easiest way to reach this oblast from central Russia (or from Russian Transcaucasia) was across the Caspian Sea, by boat from Astrakhan or Baku.

 Former administrative divisions of countries

History

Transcaspia was conquered by Russia in 1879–1885, in a series of campaigns led by Generals Lomakin, Skobelev, and Annenkov. The construction of the Transcaspian Railway was started from the shores of the Caspian in 1879 in order to secure Russian control over the region and provide a rapid military route to the Afghan border. In 1885 a crisis was precipated by the Russian annexation of the Panjdeh oasis, to the south of Merv, which nearly led to war with Britain, as it was thought that the Russians were planning to march on to Herat in Afghanistan. Until 1898 Transcaspia was part of the Governor-Generalship of Caucasus administered from Tiflis, but in that year it was made an oblast (province) of Russian Turkestan governed from Tashkent. The best known Military Governor to have ruled the region from Ashkhabad was probably General Kuropatkin, whose authoritarian methods and personal style of governance made the province very difficult for his successors to control. Consequently, the administration of Transcaspia became a byword for corruption and brutality within Russian Turkestan, as Russian administrators turned their districts into petty fiefdoms and extorted money from the local population. These abuses were fully exposed by the Pahlen Report of 1908–10.

During the revolutionary period of 1917 to 1919, parts of Transcaspia were briefly occupied by British Indian forces from Meshed. The oblast was one of the last centres of Basmachi resistance to Bolshevik rule, with the last of the rebellious Turkmen fleeing across the border to Afghanistan and Iran in 1922 and 1923.

Demographics
As of 1897, 382,487 people populated the oblast. Turkmens constituted the majority of the population. Significant minorities consisted of Kazakhs and Russians. Total Turkic speaking were 328,059 (85,8%).

Ethnic groups in 1897

Ethnic groups in Transcaspian Oblast according to 1897 Russian census

Ethnic groups in Transcaspian Oblast according to 1897 Russian census

References

 
 

 
Geography of Russia
Geography of Turkmenistan
Central Asia in the Russian Empire
Oblasts of the Russian Empire